Belarus Hi-Tech Park (HTP) is a tax and legal regime in Belarus, contributing to the favorable development of IT business. It is a Belarusian analog of Silicon Valley in the US. Belarus HTP operates on the principle of extraterritoriality. The companies registered in it can enjoy all the advantages provided, regardless of the location of their Belarusian office.

As of October 30, 2018, 388 resident companies with over 30.000 employees were registered in the HTP. The HTP resident headcount has been going up steadily over the last five years.

On the territory of the HTP, the provisions of the Belarusian Decree No. 8 "On the Development of the Digital Economy". This Decree on Development of Digital Economy was signed on December 21, 2017. Decree No. 8 entered into force on March 28, 2018. According to Decree No. 8, until January 1, 2049, residents of the Park are exempt from most taxes, including income tax. The regulations of the decree also help develop IT education and promote promising startups.

In November 2018, the Belarus Hi-Tech Park's management also approved documents that detailed the work of the cryptocurrency industry. Currency.com was the first cryptocurrency tokenized asset exchange on the HTP, which was also the first in the world to offer users tokenized government bonds.

Such support for the IT sector in 2019 increased the share of the IT sector, which provided half of the GDP growth. The export of IT services in 2017–2019 increased by 2.4 times. Production growth in the first half of 2019 was 166%. The total export of services of HTP residents in 2019 exceeded $2 billion. At the end of the first half of 2020, the park's export volumes increased by 40% compared to the same period in 2019.

In January 2020, the HTP registered 758 companies with a total of more than 58 thousand employees. In April 2020, the number of resident companies in the Park was 818 with a total of more than 61 thousand employees. In July 2020, the number of residents of the Park increased by 71 companies. In October 2020, another 83 companies became residents of the Hi-Tech Park. Thus, in October 2020, the number of residents of the Park totals 969 companies, which employ more than 65 thousand specialists.

In March 2021, the supervisory board of Hi-Tech Park carried out a decision on registration of 65 new companies as HTP residents. More than a half of newcomers are registered in 2020-2021 that indicates active development of startups.

Park specialists teach children and teenagers to program. Since 2019, the HTP has been publishing an electronic guide to applicants for IT specialties.

Description 
The organization is headed by the Director of the HTP Administration. There are two Boards in the Park structure - the Expert Board and the supervisory board. The HTP Administration is subordinate to the President of the Republic of Belarus and reports to the Council of Ministers. It's a legal entity at the national level and a nonprofit state institution. The HTP Administration's activities involve creating conditions favorable for HTP residents, promoting domestic and foreign investments in information technologies and creating a modern infrastructure.

The Hi-Tech Park is the organization in the country that has the right to provide tax benefits on a systematic basis. Resident companies enjoy important government support: they are exempted from most taxes, including value-added tax and income tax. Further, employees of the resident companies enjoy a 30% reduction in personal income tax compared with other sectors of the economy.

Highly qualified specialists enhance the competitiveness of Belarus HTP in overseas markets. They participate in IT projects of any complexity, starting from systems analysis and consulting and finishing with the design and development of complex systems.  Belarusian specialists are being trained in prestigious international educational centers, such as IBM, Microsoft, SAP, Lotus, Sun, Novell. Another advantage of Belarusian developers is that they also have deep knowledge in mathematics, physics and other sciences.

HTP is actively engaged in supporting IT education and innovative entrepreneurship. Today, HTP resident companies support about 80 joint laboratories in Belarusian technical universities. With the participation of HTP residents, the Educational Center of the Hi-Tech Park was established to provide re-education for adults who want to start a career in the IT industry, as well as training for employees of IT companies willing to improve their knowledge and skills. 1,629 people received training there in 2016, with 340 of them getting jobs in HTP companies. iTeen Academy for kids aged 6–15 years old also operates within the Educational Center.

In 2016, the HTP business incubator in Minsk hosted 55 events (conferences, workshops, contests, hackathons, etc.) which attracted more than 9,000 participants (in 2015, there were 12 events and 2,000 participants). Here, startup companies rent offices at lower rates, receive advice on commercialization of their products and assistance in search for partners and investors.

In summer 2017, a new revolutionary draft Decree regulating HTP activities has been submitted to state bodies for consideration. The Decree aims to create conditions that would facilitate the inflow of international investments, the opening of foreign representative offices and development centers. The Decree was initiated by the Director of the Belarus HTP Administration Vsevolod Yanchevsky who had been responsible for ensuring state policy in the spheres of information and high technologies since 2013. For the first time, prospects of the Decree were announced by him and Viktor Prokopenya during the visit of Belarus President Alexander Lukashenko to several IT companies in Minsk on March 13, 2017. In close cooperation with government authorities, a working group of the best specialists of the country worked on the project. It was led by the HTP Administration to ensure an effective interaction between lawmakers and people working in the IT industry. The key person among lawmakers who imbued the Decree with regulatory innovations was a Belarusian lawyer Denis Aleinikov. This Decree opens HTP doors for product companies, investment funds, as well as foreign companies that monetize IT products through advertising and paid subscription. On top of that, the Decree introduces separate institutes of English law that will stimulate investment activities, sets legal basis for driverless car technology, lifts many restrictions regarding financial operations for IT companies, stimulates a breakthrough in IT education, as well as creates prerequisites for new jobs and revenue growth.

According to a presidential decree passed in December 2017, the Hi-Tech Park will become a sandbox for blockchain startups offering tax exemptions and relying on elements of English law in commercial matters.

U.S. Secretary of State Michael Pompeo praised Hi-Tech Park. Pompeo shared his impressions of visiting the Park on his Twitter: «Inspired by what I saw at Hi-Tech Park Belarus. A great example of how Belarus can seize its extraordinary growth potential by embracing forward-looking economic policies and smart regulation. It’s clear how impactful American investment can foster prosperity across the globe».

Infrastructure  
The territory of Hi-Tech Park is located near the main thoroughfares of the capital: the central avenue, the Minsk ring road, the road to the National International Airport (distance to the airport is 40 km), and the Berlin-Minsk-Moscow railway line.

Despite the extraterritorial principle of registration of resident companies, according to the Decree No. 12, HTP occupies about 50 hectares of land for the construction of physical infrastructure. According to the general development plan, Hi-Tech Park should become the embodiment of the idea of a high-tech city whose inhabitants live, work and rest in comfortable conditions.

The residential area already consists of several multi floor buildings, as well as the kindergarten and primary school No. 31. In the business and educational zone there are a business center, offices of IT companies, a hostel for students of the IT Academy and a hotel. The public sports zone includes multi-purpose sports halls, a swimming pool, a sauna, a fitness center, a health trail, a restaurant, a café and a health center. More HTP branches are going to be opened in the regional centers of the country.

History 

The initiative of creating a Belarusian analogue of the Silicon Valley originates from Valery Tsepkalo and Mikhail Myasnikovich. On September 22, 2005, the President of the Republic of Belarus Alexander Lukashenko signed the Decree "On the Hi-Tech Park".

On January 12, 2012, India-Belarus Digital Learning Centre named after Rajiv Gandhi opened. Belarus Digital Learning Centre is dedicated to train IT-specialists and to upgrade qualifications of the professors of Belarusian technical universities.

In 2016, a joint educational project focused on teaching school students of grades 2-6 programming in Scratch was launched. The project was initiated by resident companies of Belarus Hi-Tech Park and supported by the HTP Administration and the Ministry of Education of the Republic of Belarus .

On March 15, 2017 Vsevolod Yanchevsky was appointed director of the Belarus Hi-Tech Park Administration. Before that, the position was occupied by Valery Tsepkalo.

Statistics
HTP is one of the leading innovative IT clusters in Central and Eastern Europe. As of October 30, 2018, 388 resident companies with over 30.000 employees were registered in the HTP. The HTP resident headcount has been going up steadily over the last five years by approx. 3.000 a year.

According to the HTP administration, more than 60 new companies were established by citizens of Belarus. About 20 residents are companies from China, Norway, Israel, Great Britain, USA, Austria, the Netherlands, Cyprus, France, Russia. In just 9 months of 2018, the HTP accepted about 200 new companies. This is more than in its entire 12-year history. In 2018, the number of HTP hardware residents increased to 24 out of 292 companies.

As of October 30, 2018, 388 resident companies were registered and more than 30 thousand people were employed. At the end of 2018, the number of residents increased to 454 companies. In just 9 months of 2018 (since the entry into force of the provisions of Decree No. 8), the HTP accepted about 200 new companies. In May 2019, there were 505 residents exporting IT services to almost 70 countries around the world. In April 2020, the number of residents of the Park became 818 companies with a total number of employees over 61 thousand.

In the first half of 2018, the export of the Park amounted to 1.4 billion Belarusian rubles, 40% higher compared with the same period of 2017. And this is without taking into account new companies. The software developed in the HTP in 2016 was delivered to customers from 67 countries of the world, with 49.1% of exports accounted for the countries of Western Europe, 43.2% - for the USA. According to the Park administration in 2018, 91.9% of the software produced in the Park is exported. 49.1% is supplied to European countries, 44% to the US and Canada, 4.1% to Russia and the CIS

Table.1. Computer Services Exports. Balance of Payments by the National Bank of the Republic of Belarus.

Six companies residents of Belarus` Hi-Tech Park have been featured in the 2017 Global Outsourcing 100 list: EPAM Systems, IBA Group, Ciklum, Itransition, Intetics, Bell Integrator.

Every year a new success story happens in HTP: World of Tanks, Viber, Apalon, MSQRD, Maps.me, Prisma.

Mobile applications developed by HTP residents are used by more than 1 billion people in over 150 countries of the world.  Some major international companies have already opened captive centers or global in-house centers in Belarus: IHS Markit, Playtika, Netcracker, Viber, Yandex, Fitbit, Ciclum, WorkFusion, etc. according to Ernst & Young survey, more than 30% of the Fortune Global 200 companies have worked with HTP residents. The most trending customers are Facebook, Microsoft, Northrop Grumman, PepsiCo, Whirlpool, 3M, Amazon.com, Cisco Systems, HP, Oracle, Xerox, Disney, Intel, Apple and IBM, which have worked with several companies from Belarus.

Supervisory Board 
Members of the supervisory board of the Hi-Tech Park:
 Vsevolod Yanchevsky – Aide to the Belarus President, Head of the Central Ideology Office of the Belarus Presidential Administration, formerly included in EU sanctions lists for propaganda and justification of political repressions in Belarus
 Inessa Kontsevaya – First Deputy Director of the Hi-Tech Park Administration (Secretary of the supervisory board) (chair person of the supervisory board)
 Mikhail Batura – Rector of the Belarusian State University of Informatics and Radioelectronics, formerly included in EU sanctions lists and accused of politically motivated expulsion of students
  – Dean of the Faculty of Economics at the Belarusian State University
  – Chair of the Department of Software Engineering of the Faculty of Applied Mathematics and Computer Science at the Belarusian State University
 Victor Laptev – Deputy Chairman of the Minsk City Executive Committee
 Anna Rabava – Deputy Minister of Communications and Informatization
  – General Director of the United Institute of Informatics Problems of the National Academy of Sciences of Belarus
 Dmitry Shedko – First Deputy Minister of Communications and Informatization
 Konstantin Shulgan – Deputy Head of the Operative Analytical Center Under the President of the Republic of Belarus.

See also 
 Decree on Development of Digital Economy

References

External links 
 Belarus Hi-Tech Park website

Organizations based in Minsk
Science parks in Belarus
Software companies of Belarus
Special economic zones of Belarus
2005 establishments in Belarus